Border Caballero is a 1936 American Western film directed by Sam Newfield.

Plot
Undercover lawman Tim Ross is working his way across the country as a sharpshooter in a medicine show. He runs into a former colleague working undercover to stop a series of bank robberies. When his friend is killed, Tim takes his place.

Cast
Tim McCoy as Tim Ross
Lois January as Goldie Harris
Ralph Byrd as Tex Weaver
J. Frank Glendon as Wiley Taggart
Ted Adams as Buff Brayden
John Merton as Runnyian
Earle Hodgins as Doc Shaw

External links

1936 films
1930s English-language films
American black-and-white films
1936 Western (genre) films
American Western (genre) films
Films directed by Sam Newfield
1930s American films